Luxley is a village in the southwest Midlands of England, on the border between Gloucestershire and Herefordshire near May Hill.

The name has a number of variations.  Victorian maps show Luxtre while current place names include Luxtree Farm and Upper Laxtree.

External links

Villages in Gloucestershire
Villages in Herefordshire